Qechene River is a river of central Ethiopia. It rises near Aiamsa in the Annas Mountains, and flows to the west to join the Wanchet. The watercourse's tributaries include the Ketama and Woia. According to Johann Ludwig Krapf (who calls it the "Katchenee"), the Qechene defines the boundary between the Shewan districts of Gishe and Menz.

See also 
List of rivers of Ethiopia

References 

Amhara Region
Nile basin
Rivers of Ethiopia